Guðrún Ósk Maríasdóttir (born 12 March 1989) is an Icelandic team handball player who plays the goalkeeper position.

Career
In 2011, Guðrún Ósk signed with Fram after a standout season with Fylkir. She missed the majority of the 2012–2013 season due to pregnancy.

In August 2013, she signed with FH.

She returned to Fram in 2015 and won the Icelandic championship with the club in 2017 and 2018, and was named the Playoff MVP in 2017.

In May 2018, she signed a 2-year contract with fellow Úrvalsdeild club Stjarnan. In end of September that same year, she suffered a concussion in Stjarnan's second game of the season and ended missing the rest of the season. In May 2019, Stjarnan terminated its contract with Guðrún Ósk. Due to the severity of the injury, she was unable to work and had to receive disability pension.

National team career
Guðrún has played 34 games for the Icelandic national team.

Awards, titles and accomplishments

Titles
Icelandic champion: 2013, 2017, 2018
Icelandic Cup: 2018

Titles
Úrvalsdeild Playoff MVP: 2017
Úrvalsdeild Best Goalkeeper: 2017, 2018

Personal life
Guðrún Ósk is married to Icelandic CrossFit athlete Árni Björn Kristjánsson.

References

Living people
Guðrún Ósk Maríasdóttir
Guðrún Ósk Maríasdóttir
Hanna Gudrun Stefansdottir
1989 births